The 1961–62 Women's Handball European Champions Cup was the second edition of the premier international competition for women's handball clubs. Like the inaugural edition, eight teams took part in the championship, which took place from November 1961 to 1 April 1962. Out of the eight founding members the Soviet Union didn't take part in the competition, while Romania was represented by national champion Rapid Bucharest and defending champion Ştiinţa Bucharest. Both teams were confronted in the quarter-finals, in the first match between two teams from the same country.

Sparta Prague won the competition by beating ORK Belgrade in the final. This remains the only edition won by a club from former Czechoslovakia and the last appearance of a Czech team in a final.

Quarter-finals

Semifinals

Final

References

Women's EHF Champions League
European Cup Women
European Cup Women
Eur
Eur